Mashan District is a district of the city of Jixi, Heilongjiang, People's Republic of China. It is under the administration of the Jixi city.

Administrative divisions 
Mashan District is divided into 1 subdistrict and 1 town. 
1 subdistrict
 Mashan
1 town
 Mashan

References

Administrative subdivisions of Heilongjiang